Class F: Local History of the United States and British, Dutch, French, and Latin America is a classification used by the Library of Congress Classification system. This article outlines the structure of Class F classification.

F - Local History of the United States and British, Dutch, French, and Latin America
1-975..........United States local history
1-15...............New England
16-30.............Maine
31-45.............New Hampshire
46-60.............Vermont
61-75.............Massachusetts
76-90.............Rhode Island
91-105...........Connecticut
106.................Atlantic coast. Middle Atlantic States
116-130..........New York
131-145..........New Jersey
146-160..........Pennsylvania
161-175..........Delaware
176-190..........Maryland
191-205..........District of Columbia. Washington
206-220..........The South. South Atlantic States
221-235..........Virginia
236-250..........West Virginia
251-265..........North Carolina
266-280..........South Carolina
281-295..........Georgia
296-301..........Gulf States. West Florida
306-320..........Florida
321-335..........Alabama
336-350..........Mississippi
350.5-355.......Mississippi River and Valley. Middle West
366-380..........Louisiana
381-395..........Texas
396.................Old Southwest. Lower Mississippi Valley
406-420..........Arkansas
431-445..........Tennessee
446-460..........Kentucky
461-475..........Missouri
476-485..........Old Northwest. Northwest Territory
486-500..........Ohio
516-520..........Ohio River and Valley
521-535..........Indiana
536-550..........Illinois
550.5-553.2...The Lake region. Great Lakes
561-575..........Michigan
576-590..........Wisconsin
590.3-596.3....The West. Trans-Mississippi Region. Great Plains
597.................The Northwest
598.................Missouri River and Valley
601-615..........Minnesota
616-630..........Iowa
631-645..........North Dakota
646-660..........South Dakota
661-675..........Nebraska
676-690..........Kansas
691-705..........Oklahoma
721-722..........Rocky Mountains. Yellowstone National Park
726-740..........Montana
741-755..........Idaho
756-770..........Wyoming
771-785..........Colorado
786-790..........New Southwest. Colorado River, Canyon, and Valley
791-805..........New Mexico
806-820..........Arizona
821-835..........Utah
836-850..........Nevada
850.5-851.5....Pacific States
851.7..............Cascade Range
852-854..........Pacific Northwest. Columbia River and Valley. Northwest boundary since 1846
856-870..........California
871-885..........Oregon
886-900..........Washington
901-951..........Alaska
951...............Bering Sea and Aleutian Islands. For Hawaii, see DU620
965...............The territories of the United States (General)
970................Insular possessions of the United States (General)
975................Central American, West Indian, and other countries protected by and having close political affiliations with the United States (General)
1001-1145.2..........British America
1001-1145.2..........Canada
1001-1035..........General
1035.8................Maritime provinces. Atlantic coast of Canada
1036-1040..........Nova Scotia. Acadia
1041-1045..........New Brunswick
1046-1049.7.......Prince Edward Island
1050...................St. Lawrence Gulf, River and Valley (General)
1051-1055..........Quebec
1056-1059.7.......Ontario
1060-1060.97.....Canadian Northwest. Northwest Territories
1061-1065..........Manitoba
1067...................Assiniboia
1070-1074.7.......Saskatchewan
1075-1080..........Alberta
1086-1089.7.......British Columbia
1090...................Rocky Mountains of Canada
1090.5................Arctic regions
1091-1095.5.......Yukon
1096-1100.5.......Mackenzie
1101-1105.7........Franklin
1106-1110.5........Keewatin
1121-1139..........Newfoundland
1135-1139..........Labrador
1140...................The Labrador Peninsula
1141-1145.2.......Nunavut
1170..........French America
1170..........Saint Pierre and Miquelon
1201-3799..........Latin America. Spanish America
1201-1392..........Mexico
1218.5-1221..........Antiquities. Indians
1401-1419..........Latin America (General)
1421-1440..........Central America
1435-1435.3..........Mayas
1441-1457..........Belize
1461-1477..........Guatemala
1481-1497..........Salvador (El Salvador)
1501-1517..........Honduras
1521-1537..........Nicaragua
1541-1557..........Costa Rica
1561-1577..........Panama
1569.C2..........Panama Canal Zone. Panama Canal
1601-1629..........West Indies
1630-1640..........Bermudas
1650-1660..........Bahamas
1741-1991..........Greater Antilles
1751-1854.9..........Cuba
1788-1788.22..........Communist regime
1861-1896..........Jamaica
1900-1941..........Haiti (Island). Hispaniola
1912-1930..........Haiti (Republic)
1931-1941..........Dominican Republic
1951-1983..........Puerto Rico
1991...................Navassa
2001-2151..........Lesser Antilles
2006..............Leeward Islands
2011..............Windward Islands
2016..............Islands along Venezuela coast
2033-2129.....Individual islands
2131-2133..........British West Indies
2136..............Virgin Islands of the United States
2141..............Netherlands West Indies. Dutch West Indies
2151..............French West Indies
2155-2191..........Caribbean area. Caribbean Sea
2201-3799..........South America
2201-2239..........General
2251-2299..........Colombia
2301-2349..........Venezuela
2351...................Guiana
2361-2391..........Guyana. British Guiana
2401-2431..........Suriname
2441-2471..........French Guiana
2501-2659..........Brazil
2661-2699..........Paraguay
2701-2799..........Uruguay
2801-3021..........Argentina
3031-3031.5.......Falkland Islands
3051-3285..........Chile
3301-3359..........Bolivia
3401-3619..........Peru
3701-3799..........Ecuador

References

Further reading 
 Full schedule of all LCC Classifications

F